Shen-su Sun (27 Oct 1943 – 5 Mar 2005) was a Chinese-born Australian geochemist.

Sun was born in Fuzhou, Fujian, Republic of China. He earned his bachelor's degree in geology from National Taiwan University, and obtained his Ph.D from Columbia University in 1973. During 1981 to 1999, he was a research professor in Bureau of Mineral Resources of Australia. He did significant work in lead, oxygen and sulfur isotope geochemistry. He died in Canberra, Australia.

References

1943 births
2005 deaths
Chinese geochemists
People from Fuzhou
Chemists from Fujian
Educators from Fujian
National Taiwan University alumni
Columbia University alumni
Chinese emigrants to Australia
Taiwanese emigrants to Australia
Taiwanese geochemists
Australian geochemists
Taiwanese people from Fujian